Pristionchus is a genus of nematodes (roundworms) in the family Diplogastridae that currently includes more than 50 described species. They are known mainly as non-parasitic associates of insects, especially beetles, while others have been reported from soil, organic matter, or rotting wood. The genus includes P. pacificus, a satellite model organism to the well-studied nematode Caenorhabditis elegans.

Ecology and mouth dimorphism 
In Pristionchus species associated with insects, the nematodes usually live on their hosts in a dormant stage (the dauer larva). After the death of the host insect, the nematodes resume development, feeding and reproducing on the decaying host carcass. Most species of Pristionchus show a polyphenism in their feeding structures, which allows the nematodes to access different food resources in this rapidly changing environment. In one form (the "stenostomatous" form), the mouth is elongated, narrow, and equipped with one small tooth, whereas in the other ("eurystomatous" form) it is short, wide, and with two large teeth. The emergence of a particular form depends on specific environmental conditions and the availability of food. Whereas the stenostomatous form feeds primarily on microorganisms, the eurystomatous form can feed additionally on other nematodes. In the laboratory, Pristionchus species can be cultured on bacteria such as Escherichia coli.

Reproduction 
Most known species of Pristionchus have males and females, although several species are androdioecious, consisting of males and self-fertilizing hermaphrodites. Sex determination in Pristionchus species is by an X0 system, whereby males have one sex (X) chromosome and females/hermaphrodites have two.

Species 
The following are all Pristionchus species that have been sequenced (most of them are kept in culture and available as frozen strains):
Pristionchus aerivorus —from termites in North America
Pristionchus americanus —from scarab beetles in North America
Pristionchus arcanus —forms a cryptic species complex with P. pacificus and P. exspectatus; known from termites in Japan
Pristionchus atlanticus —known from soil in the eastern United States
Pristionchus auriculatae —from rotting fruits of the fig Ficus auriculata in Shanghai, China
Pristionchus boliviae —androdioecious; from scarab beetles in South America 
Pristionchus borbonicus —from Réunion Island; notable for developing one of five different mouth forms depending on available food sources.
Pristionchus brevicauda —from Eastern Europe
Pristionchus bucculentus —associated with shining mushroom beetles and pleasing fungus beetles in Japan
Pristionchus bulgaricus —from the rose chafer in Eastern Europe
Pristionchus chinensis —from the scarab beetle Mimela sp. in Bubeng field station CAS, China
Pristionchus clavus —from Eastern Europe
Pristionchus degawai —from millipedes in Japan
Pristionchus dorci —from the stag beetle Dorcus davidis in Ganquan, China
Pristionchus elegans —from dung beetles in Japan 
Pristionchus entomophagus —hermaphroditic (males rare); cosmopolitan, common in Europe, especially on scarab beetles
Pristionchus exspectatus —the putative sister species of P. pacificus; reported from stag beetles 
Pristionchus fukushimae —from scarab beetles in Japan
Pristionchus fissidentatus —androdioecious; from Nepal and La Réunion Island 
Pristionchus hongkongensis —from stag beetles in Hong Kong
Pristionchus hoplostomus —collected from soil in Japan
Pristionchus japonicus —from soil around a dead earthworm in Japan
Pristionchus kurosawai —from Lucanus kurosawa in Songquangang, Taiwan
Pristionchus laevicollis —from millipedes in Japan
Pristionchus lheritieri —common in Europe; reported from soil, organic material, and dung beetles
Pristionchus lucani —from stag beetles in France
Pristionchus magnoliae —from fruit of Magnolia grandiflora in Shanghai, China
Pristionchus marianneae —from Popilia japonica  near Geneva, New York, USA
Pristionchus maupasi —androdioecious; from Europe and North America, especially in association with May beetles
Pristionchus maxplancki —from stag beetles in Japan; closest known outgroup to the P. pacificus species complex
Pristionchus mayeri —androdioecious; from scarab beetles on La Réunion and Mauritius 
Pristionchus musae —from banana "Musa, sp." in Yuanyang, China
Pristionchus neolucani —from stag beetles in Hong Kong
Pristionchus nudus —from a longhorn beetle, Cerambycidae, in Xishuangbanna, China
Pristionchus occultus —from Taiwan
Pristionchus pacificus —cosmopolitan distribution, most commonly in association with scarab beetles; an established laboratory model species
Pristionchus paranudus —from rotting water hyacinth bulbs in Yuanyang, China
Pristionchus passalidorum —from Passalidae sp. in Ailaoshan field station CAS, China
Pristionchus pauli —from scarab beetles in the eastern United States
Pristionchus paulseni —from Lucanus taiwanensis  in Taroko National Park, Taiwan
Pristionchus pseudaerivorus —from North America
Pristionchus purgamentorium —from Mimela sp. in Ganquan, China
Pristionchus quartusdecimus —from the Oriental beetle in Japan
Pristionchus racemosae
Pristionchus riukiariae —from millipedes in Japan
Pristionchus sikae —from the stag beetle Dorcus titanus sika in Huisun, Taiwan
Pristionchus sycomori —from Ficus sycomorus fig fruit in South Africa
Pristionchus taiwanensis
Pristionchus triformis —androdioecious; associated with dung beetles and other scarab beetles; reported from Europe, La Réunion, and Canada
Pristionchus uniformis —associated with the Colorado potato beetle in Europe and North America
Pristionchus yamagatae —from Holotrichia kiotoensis in Mamurogawa, Yamagata, Japan

Molecular phylogeny

References

External links 
http://www.pristionchus.org/
Pristionchus Scratchpad

Diplogastridae
Rhabditida genera